Albert Auguste Roze (1861-1952)  was a 19th century sculptor from Amiens, France. He was a prolific sculptor creating many notable works displayed in public spaces in France.

Career
One of his more important sculptures was entitled The Golden Virgin; it was destroyed in 1915 during World War I. The sculpture was placed on top of the Basilique Notre-Dame de Brebières. After World War I the statue was never recovered.

The sculpture of the Golden Virgin was recast and fitted atop the 76 meter bell tower in 1929, during the reconstruction of the Basilica 1927–1931.

Designs

Awards
Gold medal at the 1897 Salon of French Artists.
A street in the city center of Amiens bears his name. (Rue Albert Roze Amiens France)

References

External links

Find a Grave
Albert Roze French Wikipedia

1861 births
1952 deaths
French sculptors
19th-century sculptors
20th-century sculptors
19th-century French sculptors
20th-century French sculptors